Boernerowo is a neighbourhood in the Warsaw's borough of Bemowo. Initially the spot was occupied by a small village called Babice, with an eponymous fort located in its centre. In early 1920s the area surrounding the fort was bought by the Polish state and in 1922 the Ministry of Post and Telegraphs started the construction of the Transatlantic Radio Station. As the radio station did not occupy the entire terrain, in 1932 minister Ignacy Boerner ordered a construction of a housing area to accommodate the workers of the radio station, as well as other people working in communications industry in the nearby city of Warsaw. The settlement grew and in 1936 it was named after its founder.

After the World War II the area was taken over by the Polish Army who constructed there the Babice Airfield that was to replace the destroyed Bielany Airfield, and a large university complex of the Military Technical Academy. In 1951 the area was incorporated into the borough of Wola and then in 1994 into the borough of Bemowo.

References

 

Neighbourhoods of Bemowo